Officium (plural officia) is a Latin word with various meanings in ancient Rome, including "service", "(sense of) duty", "courtesy", "ceremony" and the like. It also translates the Greek kathekon and was used in later Latin to render more modern offices. However, this article is mainly concerned with the meaning of "an office" (the modern word office derives from it) or "bureau" in the sense of a dignitary's staff of administrative and other collaborators, each of whom was called an officialis (hence the modern official).

The Notitia Dignitatum gives us uniquely detailed information, stemming from the very imperial chanceries, on the composition of the officia of many of the leading court, provincial, military and certain other officials of the two Roman empires c. AD 400. While the details vary somewhat according to rank, from West (Rome) to East (Byzantium) and/or in particular cases, in general the leading staff would be about as follows (the English descriptions and other modern "equivalents" are approximate):

Princeps officii was the chief of staff, permanent secretary or chef de cabinet
Cornicularius was a military title, for an administrative deputy of various generals etc.
Adiutor (literally "helper") seems to have been the chief (general) assistant, or adjutant
Commentariensis was the keeper of "commentaries", an official diary
Ab actis was the keeper of records, the archivist
Numerarius ("accountant") seems to have been the receiver of taxes
Subadiuva ("under-helper") seems to have been a general assistant
Cura epistolarum was the curator of correspondence
Regerendarius may have been a registrar
Exceptor seem to have been a secretary
Singularius has been called a notary, but the word can also refer to a bodyguard

Below those "dignities", there were often a few hundred minor officials, often slaves or freedmen, doing the clerical drudgery, not deemed worthy of any more detailed mention. They are only referred to collectively, by various terms in the plural, such as cohortalini (apparently the diminutive of cohortalis, the very term suggesting significant number; see cohors amicorum).

See also
 Magister officiorum

Sources and references
 Pauly-Wissowa (German-language encyclopedia on anything relating to Classical Antiquity)
 Notitia dignitatum

Ancient Roman government